Parapadna is a genus of moths of the family Erebidae. The genus was erected by George Hampson in 1926.

Species
Parapadna placospila (Turner, 1908) Queensland
Parapadna plumbea (Rothschild, 1915) New Guinea
Parapadna zonophora (Turner, 1908) Queensland

References

Calpinae
Noctuoidea genera